Pena may refer to:

Pena (footballer), Brazilian soccer player
Pena (musical instrument), an Indian musical instrument
Pena (surname)
Pena National Palace, Sintra, Portugal
"Pena", a song by Captain Beefheart on the album Trout Mask Replica

See also
Peña (disambiguation)
Penha (disambiguation)
Pina (disambiguation)
Piña (disambiguation)